The 2006 FIFA U-20 Women's World Championship was held in Russia from 17 August to 3 September 2006. It was the officially recognized world championship for women's under-20 national association football teams. Matches were held in four Moscow stadiums (Dynamo, Lokomotiv, Podmoskovie Stadium and Torpedo Stadium) and one in Saint Petersburg (Petrovsky Stadium).

This was the third women's world youth championship organized by FIFA, but the first with an age limit of 20. The first two events, held in Canada in 2002 and Thailand in 2004, had an age limit of 19. FIFA changed the age limit to prepare for the creation of an under-17 championship in 2008.

North Korea won the tournament. They became the first Asian team to win a FIFA women's tournament and the first Asian football team to win any FIFA tournaments since Saudi Arabia's triumph in the 1989 FIFA U-16 World Championship.

Venues

Squads

Tournament
The draw for the tournament was held in Moscow's City Hall on 22 March 2006. 14 of the 16 competing teams (the two CAF teams were then still undecided) learned their first-round groupings.

The 16 participating U-20 women's teams from the six FIFA confederations are:

1.Teams that made their debut.

Group stage

Group A

All times local (UTC+4)

Group B

Group C

Group D

Knockout stage

Quarterfinals

Semifinals

3rd Place Playoff

Final

Awards

The following awards were given for the tournament:

All star team

Scorers
5 goals
 Ma Xiaoxu
 Kim Song-hui

4 goals
 Anna Blässe
 Cynthia Uwak

3 goals

 Ludmila Manicler
 Fatmire Bajramaj
 Maureen Eke
 Danesha Adams

2 goals

 Collette McCallum
 Fabiana
 Jodi-Ann Robinson
 Zi Jingjing
 Marie-Laure Delie
 Nadine Kessler
 Simone Laudehr
 Célia Okoyino Da Mbabi
 Charlyn Corral
 Rita Chikwelu
 Akudo Sabi
 Jo Yun-mi
 Jong Pok-hui
 Kil Son-hui
 Kim Kyong-hwa
 Anna Kozhnikova
 Vanessa Bürki
 Amy Rodriguez
 Jessica Rostedt
 Kelley O'Hara

1 goal

 Mercedes Pereyra
 Belén Potassa
 Danielle Brogan
 Sally Shipard
 Adriane
 Francielle
 Amanda Chiccini
 Kaylyn Kyle
 Lou Xiaoxu
 You Jia
 Zhang Weishuang
 Trésorine Nzuzi
 Laure Boulleau
 Amandine Henry
 Jessica Houara
 Louisa Necib
 Juliane Maier
 Lydia Neumann	
 Jennifer Oster
 Monique Cisneros
 Maria de Lourdes Gordillo
 Mónica Ocampo
 Abby Erceg
 Emma Humphries
 Tawa Ishola
 Hong Myong-gum
 O Kum-hui
 Ri Un-hyang
 Kim Hyang-mi
 Kim Ok-sim
 Svetlana Akimova
 Elena Terekhova
 Alexandra Long
 Casey Nogueira

Own goals
 Yuan Fan (for Finland)

Further information

This was the first time an Australian football team has played in a worldwide competition as an Asian Football Confederation team. However, the country's senior men's team was the first to play as an AFC team, competing in its first 2007 Asian Cup qualifier in February 2006, two months before the AFC qualifiers for this competition. Before 1 January 2006, Australia was a member of the Oceania Football Confederation.
This was the first U-20 Women's tournament in which a Canadian has not won the Golden Shoe award, given to the top goal scorer of the tournament. Canadians Christine Sinclair and Brittany Timko won the award in 2002 and 2004 respectively.

References

External links
FIFA U-20 Women's World Championship Russia 2006, FIFA.com
FIFA Technical Report

2006 in women's association football
2006 in Russian football
2006
FIFA
August 2006 sports events in Europe
September 2006 sports events in Europe
2006 in youth association football